Maia Harumi Shibutani (born July 20, 1994) is an American ice dancer. Partnered with her brother Alex Shibutani, she is a two time 2018 Olympic bronze medalist, a three-time World medalist (silver in 2016, bronze in 2011 and 2017), the 2016 Four Continents champion, and a two-time U.S. national champion (2016, 2017). The siblings have won six titles on the Grand Prix series and stood on the podium at 14 consecutive U.S. Championships, at five levels including eight as seniors. They are two-time members of the US Olympic team, competing at the 2014 and 2018 Winter Olympics. In 2018, the siblings became the first ice dancers who are both of Asian descent to medal at the Olympics (winning bronze in both team figure skating and the individual ice dancing event). They are the second sibling duo to ever share an ice dancing Olympic medal, and the first from the United States. The Shibutani siblings are often referred to by their nickname the Shib Sibs.

Personal life
Maia Harumi Shibutani was born on July 20, 1994, in New York City. She is the daughter of Chris Shibutani and Naomi Uyemura, both of Japanese descent, who met as Harvard musicians. She has an older brother, Alex Shibutani, who competes with her as her partner in the discipline of Ice Dance. She started figure skating at the age of 4 in 1998 in Old Greenwich, Connecticut, where she was a student at Greenwich Academy in Greenwich, Connecticut.

Maia lived in Colorado Springs from 2005 through 2007 and was home-schooled. She moved to Ann Arbor, Michigan in 2007 and graduated from Huron High School in Ann Arbor in 2012. She enrolled at the University of Michigan in the fall of 2012.

In 2019, Shibutani was diagnosed with a malignant mass on her kidney. She began immediate treatment.

Career

Early career
Maia Shibutani began skating at age four. She originally trained as a single skater and was taught by Slavka Kohout Button, a coach best known for guiding US ladies' champion Janet Lynn. A key source of inspiration for Maia and her brother Alex to pursue ice dancing came in March 2003 when their family attended the World Championships in Washington D.C. Alex Shibutani recalled, "We were seated close to the ice in the second row, and when the ice dancers came out for their warm up, we could actually feel a gust of wind as the skaters flew by. We were so impressed with the artistry, skating quality, and speed of the top teams that we decided to give it a try."

2004–2005 season
Maia and Alex Shibutani first teamed up as ice dance partners in the spring of 2004. Their singles coach, Kathy Bird, arranged for them to work with their first ice dancing coaches Andy Stroukoff and Susie Kelley. The Shibutanis also worked with Mary Marchiselli, and their first free dance program was choreographed by Josh Babb.

During the 2004–2005 season, their first season of competition, they competed on the juvenile level, which is the lowest competitive level in the U.S. Figure Skating testing structure. They competed at the 2005 North Atlantic Regional Championships, the qualifying competition for the U.S. Junior Championships, and won the competition. The win qualified them for the 2005 U.S. Junior Championships. At that competition, they placed second in the first compulsory dance, fourth in the second compulsory dance, and third in the free dance, ending up with the silver medal.

2005–2006 season
The Shibutanis moved up to the intermediate level and embarked on several visits to Colorado Springs, Colorado, to work with choreographer Tom Dickson. During that season, they were also coached by Judy Blumberg on the east coast. After unexpectedly strong results in their first year competing at the intermediate level at the Lake Placid Ice Dance Competition  (including first place in every compulsory and free dance segment of the competition that they entered at the Lake Placid Ice Dance Competition in the summer of 2005), the Shibutanis decided to relocate to Colorado Springs on a full-time basis in order to benefit from the strong training center environment of the Broadmoor Skating Club. In Colorado Springs, their primary coach was Patti Gottwein During that time, they also worked with Rich Griffin, Damon Allen, Eric Schulz, and Christopher Dean.

The Shibutanis won the Southwestern Regional Championships, qualifying for the 2006 U.S Junior Championships. At the 2006 U.S. Junior Championships, they placed second in the first compulsory dance and then won the second compulsory and free dances to win the title overall. They worked as guest bloggers and aides for the media staff for U.S. Figure Skating at the 2006 U.S. Championships, and again at the 2006 Four Continents, which were held in Colorado Springs.

2006–2007 season
The Shibutanis moved up to the novice level, which is the first of the three levels that compete at the U.S. Championships. Strong results at the Lake Placid Ice Dance Championships, including first place in the Novice Free Dance event, earned them their first opportunity to compete internationally under the ISU Judging System. At the North American Challenge event in Burnaby, British Columbia, they were the highest placing Americans in the novice event, pulling up from fifth place after the compulsory to second overall.

At the 2007 Midwestern Sectional Championships, their qualifying competition for the national championships, the Shibutanis placed second in the first compulsory dance and then won the second compulsory and the free dances to win the competition overall and qualify for the 2007 U.S. Championships. At US Nationals, the Shibutanis placed second in both compulsory dances, but with a win in the free dance were able to capture the novice gold medal. This was their second consecutive national title.

Following the 2007 U.S. Championships, the Shibutanis relocated once again, moving to Michigan to be coached by Marina Zueva and Igor Shpilband at the Arctic Edge Arena in Canton, Michigan. An important factor in the decision to relocate their training based included the opportunity to live and train in an area which could provide access to both world class ice dance coaching, as well as excellent educational opportunities. Alex Shibutani, at the time of the coaching change, had two years left of high school and was considering his university options.

2007–2008 season

The Shibutanis moved up to the junior level nationally. However, in an unusual circumstance for junior level competitors, they were unable to compete internationally on the junior level because Maia was not yet old enough. At the 2008 Midwestern Sectionals, the Shibutanis placed fourth in the compulsory dance and then third in the original and free dances to win the bronze medal overall. This medal qualified them for the 2008 U.S. Championships. At Nationals, they placed 7th in the compulsory dance, 2nd in the original dance, and 4th in the free dance. They placed 4th overall, winning the pewter medal. This was their fourth consecutive year earning a medal and podium placement, competing at four different levels at the national championship level.

2008–2009 season: Silver at World Junior Championships

Maia Shibutani became age-eligible to compete on the international junior circuit. The Shibutanis made their junior international debut on the ISU Junior Grand Prix (JGP). At their first event, the 2008–09 ISU Junior Grand Prix event in Courchevel, France, they placed second in the compulsory dance and then won the original and free dances to win the gold medal overall by a margin of victory of 11.00 points. At their second Junior Grand Prix event in Madrid, Spain, they won the silver medal. These two medals qualified them for the  2008–2009 ISU Junior Grand Prix Final for which they were the third-ranked qualifiers. The Junior Grand Prix Final was held concurrently with the senior final for the first time and so did not have a compulsory dance segment. The Shibutanis placed 7th in the original dance and 3rd in the free dance, finishing in 4th place overall.

The Shibutanis went on to the 2009 U.S. Championships, where they competed on the junior level for the second consecutive year. At the event, the Shibutanis placed second in the compulsory dance, the original dance, and the free dance. They won the silver medal overall marking their fifth consecutive podium finish at a national-level competition. Following the competition, the Shibutanis were named to the team to the 2009 World Junior Championships.

At the 2009 Junior World Championships in Sofia, Bulgaria, the Shibutanis placed 5th in the compulsory dance, 4th in the original dance, and 2nd in the free dance. At the ages of 14 and 17, they won the silver medal.

2009–2010 season
For the 2009–2010 season, the Shibutanis continued to compete at the junior level, as Maia at just 15, remained age-ineligible to compete on the senior level internationally. On the Junior Grand Prix series, the Shibutanis won gold medals at both their JGP events - in Lake Placid, New York, and in Zagreb, Croatia. At the JGP Final in Tokyo, Japan, they won the bronze medal.  At the 2010 US Nationals, competing for their third and final time at the junior level, they won the Junior ice dance title. At the 2010 Junior Worlds, their final junior event after having competed for only two seasons on the international circuit, they finished just off the podium in fourth place.

2010–2011 season: World bronze medal

At the ages of 16 and 19, the Shibutanis advanced to the senior level and experienced a historic rookie season. At their senior international debut, they finished fifth at the 2010 Nebelhorn Trophy, moving up from a disappointing eighth place in the short dance with a strong second place in the free dance, finishing ahead of several veteran senior competitors. During their debut season competing in the senior Grand Prix, they won the bronze medals at both the 2010 NHK Trophy (pulling up from 5th place after the short dance) and the 2010 Skate America (pulling up from fourth place after the short dance), making them the first ice dance team to medal at both Grand Prix events during their first season, rising from the junior and then competing on the senior level. They were first alternates for the 2010–11 Grand Prix final.

The Shibutanis debuted domestically at the senior level with a second place at the 2011 U.S. Nationals behind Meryl Davis and Charlie White. At their first ISU Championship event as senior competitors, the 2011 Four Continents championships, they once again finished just behind Davis and White, earning a silver medal. Maia and Alex Shibutani became the first figure skaters of Asian descent in the history of the sport to medal in ice dance at an ISU championship event. At the 2011 World Championships, an event which had to be postponed and relocated from Tokyo to Moscow owing to the earthquake disaster in Japan, they were in fourth after the short dance, 4.09 points behind third-placed Nathalie Péchalat and Fabian Bourzat. In the free dance, they scored 4.34 ahead of Pechalat and Bourzat, both of whom had fallen. The Shibutanis moved third place overall by 0.25 points and won a bronze medal in their World Championships debut. Their bronze medal finish remains the highest world championship debut of any US ice dance team in history. At the ages of 16 and 20, they were also the youngest world medalists in the discipline of ice dance in over 50 years.

2011–2012 season

The Shibutanis started their season with a silver medal at the 2011 Finlandia Trophy. Beginning their Grand Prix season, they won silver at the 2011 Cup of China. A week later they captured their first senior Grand Prix title, earning gold at the 2011 NHK Trophy, pulling up from third place after the short dance and edging Kaitlyn Weaver and Andrew Poje for gold by 0.09 points. It was the Shibutanis' first senior Grand Prix title, earned during just their second season competing at the senior level. Their combined results qualified them for the Grand Prix Final where they finished in fifth place.

At the 2012 US National championships, the Shibutanis repeated as the silver medalists behind Davis and White. The Shibutanis finished 4th at the 2012 Four Continents, an event during which Alex competed in the free dance while extremely ill, and 8th at the 2012 World Championships.

During the off-season, the Shibutanis were invited as athlete ambassadors by Secretary of State Hillary Clinton, to attend a dinner in honor of Japanese Prime Minister Yoshihiko Noda on May 1, 2012, in Washington, D.C.

When the coaching partnership of Igor Shpilband and Marina Zoueva came to an end in June 2012, the Shibutanis - along with Davis and White, and Virtue and Moir - chose to continue their training at the Arctic Edge Arena under the primary direction of Marina Zoueva.

2012–2013 season
The Shibutanis placed third in the short dance at the 2012 Rostelecom Cup. They paused their free dance for half a minute due to Alex pulling a muscle in his thigh. They were allowed to continue from the point of interruption and finished 4th overall, their first and thus far only time over 10 consecutive seasons and 20 Grand Prix events, that they did not finish on the podium at a junior or senior Grand Prix event. At their second Grand Prix event, the 2012 NHK Trophy they won the bronze medal. The Shibutanis also took bronze at the 2013 U.S. Championships. They then competed at the 2013 Four Continents and finished 4th. At the 2013 World Championships, the Shibutanis finished 8th.

2013–2014 season
The Shibutanis began their season with another injury which forced them to withdraw from the US Classic in September. They began their competitive season on the Grand Prix by capturing bronze medals at both of their events - 2013 Skate America and 2013 NHK Trophy - qualifying as alternates to the Grand Prix Final. At the 2014 U.S. Championships they earned the bronze medal and were named in the U.S. team to the 2014 Winter Olympics in Sochi, Russia. They placed 9th at the Olympics. The Shibutanis finished their season with strong performances and a 6th-place finish at 2014 World Championships.

2014–2015 season
The Shibutanis started their season by winning the 2014 Ondrej Nepela Trophy. Combined with their gold medal at the 2014 Ice Challenge they were the top finishers in the 2014-2015 ISU Challenge Cup series. On the Grand Prix circuit, they won the silver medals at both of their events, 2014 Skate America and the 2014 Cup of China. Their results on the Grand Prix series qualified them for the 2014–15 Grand Prix Final in Barcelona, Spain, where they placed 4th.

At the 2015 U.S. Championships, the duo won the silver medal. They then went on to compete at the 2015 Four Continents Championships where they finished second in the short dance and third place overall. They completed their season with a fifth-place finish at the 2015 World Championships.

2015–2016 season: Unprecedented Return to the World podium

The Shibutanis began their season by winning bronze at 2015 Ondrej Nepela Trophy. On the Grand Prix circuit, both of their programs - a short dance to the music of Coppelia, and their free dance program to the music of Fix You by  Coldplay - earned them standing ovations. They won silver at 2015 Skate Canada International and gold at the 2015 NHK Trophy, for their second career Grand Prix event title.

They qualified for the 2015–16 Grand Prix Final as the fourth ranked team based on qualification criteria that had been modified in an attempt to account for the partially cancelled Trophee Bompard event. Their combined short dance and free dance score from NHK Trophy of 174.43 points was the highest total score amongst all competitors during the Grand Prix season. At the Grand Prix Final event, they placed 4th in the short dance. The night before the free dance, however, Alex became severely ill with food poisoning. They chose to compete nonetheless, and managed to earn yet another standing ovation for their free dance with a highly emotional performance. They finished 4th in the free dance and 4th overall. They had to withdraw from the exhibition so that Alex could recover.

At the 2016 U.S. Championships, the Shibutanis placed second behind Madison Chock and Evan Bates during the short dance, but moved up to first place following the free dance to win their first senior US title. They earned standing ovations from the audience during both segments of the competition, as well as when their scores and results were announced.

The Shibutanis next competed at the 2016 Four Continents Championships in Taipei, Taiwan. They set personal bests and finished first in both segments of the competition, capturing their first ISU Championship title. With this title, they became the first ice dancers of Asian descent to win an ISU ice dance championship event.
The Shibutanis ended their season at the 2016 World Figure Skating Championships held in Boston MA. Skating before a hometown crowd (Alex was born in Boston) they set new personal best scores, finished second in both segments of the competition, and with a silver medal earned their second Worlds medal. Their return to the World podium after a 5-year gap, is unprecedented in the sport.

2016–2017 season
The Shibutanis began the 2016–17 season with a gold medal at the Skate America Grand Prix in Chicago. They followed that with another victory at the Cup of China Grand Prix event held in Beijing, once again qualifying for the Grand Prix of Figure Skating Final. At the Grand Prix Final event in Marseille, France, the Shibutanis were ranked second after the short dance, placing behind Tessa Virtue and Scott Moir from Canada, and ahead of reigning World champions, Gabriella Papadakis and Guillaume Cizeron. A third-place finishing the free dance portion of the competition placed them third place overall - the bronze medal being their first medal at a Grand Prix Final. At the 2017 U.S. Championships, the Shibutanis won their second consecutive national title, once again defeating Madison Chock and Evan Bates. Their short dance performance set a new U.S. scoring record. The siblings took silver at the 2017 Four Continents in Gangneung, South Korea, placing second in both segments of the competition to Canada's Tessa Virtue and Scott Moir. The Shibutanis delivered a performance of their "Evolution" free dance which earned them their ISU best free dance score in spite of Alex needing to quickly repair damage to his blade which occurred during the on-ice warm-up period, just moments before they competed.

At the 2017 World Championships in Helsinki, Finland, they ranked fifth in the short dance and fourth in the free dance, ending up third overall. With their third world medal, a bronze, the Shibutanis notably demonstrated their ability as competitors to deliver under pressure situations. It was their placement that enabled the US team to qualify three entries in ice dance to compete at the 2018 Winter Olympics. The Shibutanis were the only members of the U.S. delegation to earn a medal at this pre-Olympic world championship.

2017–2018 season: Olympic Bronze medals

The Shibutanis made their season debut in October during the Grand Prix Series at the 2017 Rostelecom Cup. They scored 77.30 in the short dance and 111.94 in the free dance to place first in both events and won the gold medal over 7-time Russian national champions, Ekaterina Bobrova and Dimitri Soloviev, with 189.24 points. At their second Grand Prix event, 2017 Skate America, they again won both the short and free dance for a total of 194.25 and first place overall, qualifying for the 2017/18 Grand Prix Final in Nagoya, Japan. At the Grand Prix Final, they earned a second consecutive bronze medal. At the 2018 U.S. Figure Skating Championships, the Shibutanis placed first in the short dance and third in the free dance, placing them second overall behind Madison Hubbell and Zachary Donohue.

At the 2018 Winter Olympics, the Shibutanis were chosen to represent the United States in the team event. They placed second in both segments, helping the U.S. team win the bronze medal. They became the first ice dancers who are both of Asian descent to medal at the Winter Olympics. In the ice dance event, they placed 4th in the short dance, 3rd in the free dance, and won the bronze medal with a combined total of 192.59 points.

The Shibutanis chose to not compete at the 2018 World Championships.

Programs

Post-2018

Pre-2018

Competitive highlights

GP: Grand Prix; CS: Challenger Series; JGP: Junior Grand Prix

(with Alex Shibutani)

Senior results

Junior results

Detailed results
(with Alex Shibutani)

Senior results

Social media presence and television appearances
Maia and Alex Shibutani are amongst the most active Olympic athletes engaged across several social media platforms. Their YouTube channel @ShibSibs, established in 2012, includes 95 videos which have been viewed almost nine million times by over 157,000 subscribers, as of April 2018. Videos consist a range of formats including behind-the-scenes montages from their travels throughout the world for training, exhibition shows and competitions. Amongst the popular are lip synch music videos with casts which include popular Olympic figure skaters and gymnasts from all over the world, including Yuzuru Hanyu, Mao Asada, Michelle Kwan, Kristi Yamaguchi, Brian Boitano, Javier Fernandez, Adam Rippon, Meryl Davis and Charlie White. Videos are created (including filming, editing) entirely by the Shibutanis.

Their respective Instagram and Twitter accounts (@maiashibutani, @alexshibutani) have been tagged as accounts to follow by various media accounts including global media publications such as the New York Times as "Olympian Instagram Accounts to follow."

The Shibutanis were guests on the Nickelodeon television show Nicky Ricky Dicky & Dawn, appearing as themselves during episode 304, broadcast in 2017. They have made several appearances on NBC's the TODAY Show, including to perform on the Rockefeller Center rink and to introduce Ralph Lauren designed outfits for the 2018 US Olympic team.

In September 2020, the Shibutanis appeared on The TODAY Show to discuss their new children's book, Kudo Kids.

Philanthropy and diplomacy
 In 2017, the Shibutanis were named Sports Envoys by the U.S. State Department's Sports Diplomacy Office, joining a select roster of figure skaters, including Michelle Kwan and Evan Lysacek, who have been named to this role in the past. As envoys, the siblings have traveled to South Korea (2017) and Japan (2018, 2019).
 Right To Play Athlete Ambassadors since 2013
 LA2028 Athlete Advisory Commission members. Active involvement in the successful bid which brings the 2028 Summer Olympics back to the U.S. The Shibutanis participated in the panel presentation at the US Olympic Media Summit, joining LA2028 Chairman Casey Wasserman and Athletes Relations Liaison Janet Evans.
 Other organizations and causes which the Shibutanis have lent through support through skating performances, fundraising and social media engagement support include: The Jimmy Fund, Charity: Water (where Maia raised over $10,000 as part of her 2017 birthday campaign), One Fund Boston, and NOH8 Campaign.

Awards and honors
 Maia Shibutani is a two-time recipient (2012, 2014) of a Travel & Training Grant from the Women's Sports Foundation
 The siblings are two-time winners of the Edi Award from the Professional Skaters Association for outstanding ice dance performance at US Nationals
 The Shibutanis are several time winners of the US Olympic Committee "Team of the Month" award (including in October 2017 and December 2017) for their competitive achievements while representing Team USA internationally.

Brand partnerships and sponsors
 Tumi Inc. - brand ambassadors
 Ralph Lauren Corporation - official sponsored athletes along with fellow Olympians Gus Kenworthy, Aja Evans, Jamie Anderson and Paralympian Rico Roman.
 Intel - Global Team Intel Athletes for the 2018 Winter Olympic Games 
 Coca-Cola Corporation's Minute Maid brand
 The Hershey Company's Ice Breakers brand
 Smucker's Milk-Bone brand

References

External links

Maia Shibutani / Alex Shibutani at IceNetwork.com

American female ice dancers
1994 births
Sportspeople from New York City
Sportspeople from Greenwich, Connecticut
Living people
American sportspeople of Japanese descent
World Figure Skating Championships medalists
Four Continents Figure Skating Championships medalists
World Junior Figure Skating Championships medalists
Figure skaters at the 2014 Winter Olympics
Figure skaters at the 2018 Winter Olympics
Medalists at the 2018 Winter Olympics
Olympic bronze medalists for the United States in figure skating
University of Michigan alumni
Sportspeople from Ann Arbor, Michigan
American dancers of Asian descent
21st-century American women